Yu-Hwa Lo is a physicist, engineer, academic and researcher. He is a Professor of Electrical and Computer Engineering at University of California at San Diego (UCSD).

Lo has published over 500 articles and owns 50 patents. His research interests include biophotonics, nanophotonics, single photon detectors, condensed matter physics for advanced device concept, microfluidics, and biomedical devices and instruments.

Lo is the Founding Director and Executive Committee Member of San Diego Nanotechnology Infrastructure (SDNI) and is the site director for NSF National Nanotechnology Coordinated Infrastructure.

Education
Lo received his bachelor's degree in Electrical Engineering from the National Taiwan University in 1981. At the University of California, Berkeley, he completed his master's degree and Ph.D. in Electrical Engineering in 1986 and 1987 respectively.

Career
After working at Bellcore from 1987 to 1990 as a member of technical staff, Lo became an assistant professor at Cornell University in 1991 for the School of Electrical Engineering where later, he was appointed associate professor in 1996. At the University of California at San Diego (UCSD) since 1999, he is a Professor in the Department of Electrical and Computer Engineering, where he was awarded the Distinguished William S. C. Chang Endowed Chair in Electrical and Computer Engineering. He has been a Visiting Professor at the Bioengineering Department, National Chia-Tung University, Taiwan since 2012.

Among his non-academic positions, Lo has held the position of the CTO and board of director of Nova Crystals, the Director of San Diego Nanotechnology Infrastructure (SDNI), which is a Center for National Nanotechnology Coordinated Infrastructure (NNCI), and the co-founder and advisor of NanoCellect Biomedical, a biotech company.

Research
Lo's research is focused on two areas, the first one being on condensed matter photonics and optoelectronic materials and devices with an emphasis on devices and novel physical mechanisms for ultrasensitive light detection with applications in imaging, LiDAR, and medical and bioimaging. The second area of focus is microfluidics, lab-on-a-chip devices, and biomedical and biophotonic devices for single cell analysis, diagnosis, and drug discovery.

Photonic Devices
Lo invented the direct wafer fusion (i.e. bonding of two semiconductors without an intermediate layer) process with Raj Bhat. The process was licensed to industry to produce high brightness light emitting diodes (LEDs), which commenced the transition of traffic lights (red and ember colors) and automobile lighting from incandescent light to solid state lighting. He formulated and demonstrated the concept of compliant substrate to enable growth of epitaxial layers beyond the Matthew and Blakeslee's critical thickness limit.

Along with his group, Lo invented and theorized the self-quenching and self-recovering mechanisms for semiconductor detectors capable of detecting single photons. He discovered the effect of cycling excitation process (CEP) in disordered materials and invented photodetectors with intrinsic carrier multiplication gain based on this mechanism. The devices are used for LiDAR and low light imaging.

Biomedical Devices
Lo's group invented the first bench-top microfluidic fluorescence-activated-cell-sorter (FACS), which is the most compact system of its kind.

Lo's lab furthered the development by integrating the imaging capability to the system and demonstrated one of the world's first image-guided FACS systems.  Another major advancement his lab has achieved is to produce the world's first 3D imaging flow cytometers capable of producing 1000 high quality 3D cell images per second, and incorporate artificial intelligence into the above system for cell analysis, classification, and cell type discovery.

Bibliography
Lo, Y. H. (1991). New approach to grow pseudomorphic structures over the critical thickness. Applied Physics Letters, 59(18), 2311–2313.
Bhat, R., & Lo, Y. H. (1993). U.S. Patent No. 5,207,864. Washington, DC: U.S. Patent and Trademark Office.
Berdichevsky, Y., Khandurina, J., Guttman, A., & Lo, Y. H. (2004). UV/ozone modification of poly (dimethylsiloxane) microfluidic channels. Sensors and Actuators B: Chemical, 97(2-3), 402–408.
Soci, C., Zhang, A., Xiang, B., Dayeh, S. A., Aplin, D. P. R., Park, J., ... & Wang, D. (2007). ZnO nanowire UV photodetectors with high internal gain. Nano letters, 7(4), 1003–1009.
Park, J. H., Ndao, A., Cai, W., Hsu, L., Kodigala, A., Lepetit, T., ... & Kanté, B. (2020). Symmetry-breaking-induced plasmonic exceptional points and nanoscale sensing. Nature Physics, 16(4), 462–468.

References 

Living people
American physicists
American engineers
University of California, San Diego faculty
National Taiwan University alumni
University of California, Berkeley alumni
Date of birth missing (living people)
Taiwanese expatriates in the United States
Expatriate academics in the United States
Cornell University faculty
Year of birth missing (living people)